Henry Belasyse, 2nd Earl Fauconberg (13 April 1742 – 23 March 1802) was a British politician and peer.

Family
Fauconberg was the son of Thomas Belasyse, 1st Earl Fauconberg and Catherine Betham.

Career
He served as the Member of Parliament for Peterborough between 1768 and 1774, sitting for the Whig party. Following his succession to his father's title in 1774, Fauconberg assumed his seat in the House of Lords. He was a Lord of the Bedchamber from 1777 until his death in 1802, and was Custos Rotulorum and Lord Lieutenant of the North Riding of Yorkshire over the same period. In 1779 he raised a Yorkshire regiment of fencible infantry, 'Lord Fauconberg's Regiment' or 'Fauconberg's Fencibles' of which he was colonel. They were disbanded in 1783.

Marriages and issue
On 29 May 1766, he married the Hon. Charlotte Lamb, the daughter of Sir Matthew Lamb, 1st Baronet and sister of Peniston Lamb, 1st Viscount Melbourne. Together they had four daughters: 
Lady Anne Belasyse (1760–1808), married Sir George Wombwell, 2nd Baronet in 1791 and had issue.
Lady Charlotte Belasyse (1767–1825), married Thomas Edward Belasyse-Wynn. No issue.
Lady Elizabeth Belasyse (1770–1819), married firstly Bernard Howard, 12th Duke of Norfolk in 1789 and had issue. Married secondly Richard Bingham, 2nd Earl of Lucan in 1794 and had issue.
Lady Harriet Belasyse (1776– died young).

On 5 January 1791 he married Jane Cheshyre, daughter of John Cheshyre, Esq., of Bennington co. Hertford.  She died 4 April 1820 and they had no children. 

As Fauconberg had no sons, his earldom became extinct upon his death. He was succeeded by his cousin, Rowland Belasyse, in his viscountcy and barony. Through his wife he was the uncle of the Whig Prime Minister William Lamb, 2nd Viscount Melbourne.

References

1742 births
1802 deaths
Earls in the Peerage of Great Britain
Members of the Privy Council of Great Britain
Whig (British political party) MPs
Lord-Lieutenants of the North Riding of Yorkshire
Members of the Parliament of Great Britain for English constituencies
British MPs 1768–1774
Viscounts Fauconberg